Imants Terrauds (born 27 July 1936) is an Australian fencer. He competed in the team épée event at the 1964 Summer Olympics.

References

External links
 

1936 births
Living people
Australian male fencers
Olympic fencers of Australia
Fencers at the 1964 Summer Olympics